Wilhelm Bernd "Willi" Baues (born 21 November 1948 in Mönchengladbach) is a former West German slalom canoeist who competed in the 1970s. He won a silver medal in the C-2 event at the 1972 Summer Olympics in Munich.

Baues also won two medals at the 1973 ICF Canoe Slalom World Championships in Muotathal with a gold in the C-2 team event and a bronze in the C-2 event.

References

1948 births
Canoeists at the 1972 Summer Olympics
German male canoeists
Living people
Olympic canoeists of West Germany
Olympic silver medalists for West Germany
Olympic medalists in canoeing
Medalists at the 1972 Summer Olympics
Sportspeople from Mönchengladbach
Medalists at the ICF Canoe Slalom World Championships